The Yangpu Peninsula is a peninsula located in Danzhou, on the northwestern coast of Hainan Province, China. It has a  coastline containing many natural harbors.

Geology
It has plentiful deposits of titanium.

Yangpu Economic Development Zone

The zone is an area covering . that contains the Port of Yangpu, an oil refinery, a petroleum commercial reserve base, a 448,000 K power station, and the town of Yangpu. The area is Hainan's largest economic zone and the first development zone approved for lease to foreign investors by the Chinese government.

Yangpu Ancient Salt Field

This archeological heritage site is located in Yantian village. The area comprises more than 1,000 stones, cut flat on top, used to dry seawater to produce salt.

See also
 Ocean Flower Island

References

External links
Yangpu Economic Development Zone government website

Landforms of Hainan
Peninsulas of China
Peninsulas of Hainan